Dolge may refer to:

 Alfred Dolge, German-American industrialist
 Dolge Orlick, a character in the Charles Dickens novel Great Expectations
 Department of Local Government and the Environment (DoLGE), a governmental body in the Isle of Man

See also
 Dolgeville, a village in New York State named for Alfred Dolge
 Dolgesheim, a village in Germany
 Dolge Njive, Gorenja Vas–Poljane, a settlement in Slovenia
 Dolge Njive, Lenart, a settlement in Slovenia
 Dovhe, Slovianoserbsk Raion, a settlement in eastern Ukraine called Dolge in Russian
 Doge (disambiguation)